Hikawa Shrine may refer to:

 Hikawa Shrine (Saitama), the main Shinto shrine in Saitama Prefecture, which has several branch shrines, including:
 Hikawa Shrine (Akasaka), in Akasaka, Minato, Tokyo
 Hikawa Shrine (Kawagoe)